In the mathematical field of set theory, an ideal is a partially ordered collection of sets that are considered to be "small" or "negligible". Every subset of an element of the ideal must also be in the ideal (this codifies the idea that an ideal is a notion of smallness), and the union of any two elements of the ideal must also be in the ideal.

 
 if  and  then  and
 if  then 

Ideals in the set-theoretic sense are exactly ideals in the order-theoretic sense, where the relevant order is set inclusion. Also, they are exactly ideals in the ring-theoretic sense on the Boolean ring formed by the powerset of the underlying set. The dual notion of an ideal is a filter.

Terminology

Examples of ideals

General examples

 For any set  and any arbitrarily chosen subset  the subsets of  form an ideal on  For finite  all ideals are of this form.
 The finite subsets of any set  form an ideal on 
 For any measure space, subsets of sets of measure zero.
 For any measure space, sets of finite measure. This encompasses finite subsets (using counting measure) and small sets below.
 A bornology on a set  is an ideal that covers  

Ideals on the natural numbers

 The ideal of all finite sets of natural numbers is denoted Fin.
 The  on the natural numbers, denoted  is the collection of all sets  of natural numbers such that the sum  is finite. See small set.
 The  on the natural numbers, denoted  is the collection of all sets  of natural numbers such that the fraction of natural numbers less than  that belong to  tends to zero as  tends to infinity.

Ideals on the real numbers

 The  is the collection of all meager sets of real numbers.

Ideals on other sets

This ideal has been studied extensively by W. Hugh Woodin.

Operations on ideals

 To every ideal there is a corresponding filter, called its .

Relationships among ideals

Isomorphisms of quotient Boolean algebras induced by Rudin–Keisler isomorphisms of ideals are called .

See also

References

 

Set theory